The 1956 Olympic flame hoax was a hoax during the 1956 Summer Olympics, in which Barry Larkin, a veterinary student from Melbourne, ran with a homemade torch and fooled spectators, including a police escort and the Lord Mayor of Sydney, into thinking he was the torchbearer of the Olympic flame.

Background

In the 1956 Summer Olympics, the Olympic torch was scheduled to enter Sydney, carried by Harry Dillon. Dillon would present the torch to the Lord Mayor of Sydney, Pat Hills, at Sydney Town Hall. Hills would then make a speech and pass the torch to Bert Button.

Larkin and eight other students at St John's College, University of Sydney planned to protest against the Olympic flame torch relay. One reason for the protest was that the torch relay was invented by the Nazis for the 1936 Summer Olympics in Berlin, Germany.

Hoax

Preparation
The students were aided in planning the hoax because Larkin was acquainted with Marc Marsden, the organiser of the real relay. Their plan was for one student, dressed in white shorts and a white top, to carry a fake torch. The fake torch was made of a wooden chair leg painted silver, on top of which was a plum pudding can. A pair of underpants, worn by one of the students in National Service, was put inside the can, soaked in kerosene. The underpants were set on fire. Another student dressed as a motorcycle outrider by wearing a reserve airforce uniform.

Execution
Before Dillon arrived, the two students went out carrying the fake torch. At the beginning, people noticed they were joking and spectating police laughed at them. Then the underpants fell out of the torch because the fake runner was swinging his arms too hard. The runner panicked and fled. Peter Gralton, one of the nine students, went to get the pants and told Larkin to pick up the torch. With Larkin holding the torch, Gralton kicked Larkin's backside and told him to run.

Larkin did so, running the rest of the way to Sydney Town Hall. He ran the rest of the route, protected by police who thought he was Dillon. Larkin then presented the torch to Hills. As Hills was unprepared for the early arrival, he was taken by surprise and did not look at the torch, going straight to his speech. While Hills was talking, Larkin walked quietly away, avoiding attention.  Hills did not realise the torch was a fake until someone whispered in his ear to tell him. Hills looked around for Larkin, but by now Larkin had merged into the crowd and escaped.

When the crowd discovered the torch was fake, they grew unruly. When Dillon arrived with the real torch, the crowd was still unsettled. Hills had to calm down the crowd and the police had to clear a path to allow Dillon to get through. When Button took the torch, an army truck had to clear his path.

Aftermath
When Larkin returned to university, he was congratulated by the director of the college and was given a standing ovation by fellow students when he attended an exam later that morning. Larkin went on to become a successful veterinary surgeon.

The fake torch was taken to the reception of the main hall and then ended up in the possession of John Lawler, who had been travelling with the relay in a car. He kept it until it was discarded when tidying his house.

Related events
During the 2000 Summer Olympics in Sydney, the media reported the story of Larkin's hoax. As a result, police took measures to prevent any repetition of the hoax, including having security guards line the route. There were two attempts to disrupt the relay; two people attempted to steal the torch, and one man tried to put out the torch using a fire extinguisher, but none succeeded.

References

1956 Summer Olympics
Hoaxes in Australia
1950s hoaxes